The Solocma is a left tributary of the river Târnava Mică in Romania. It flows into the Târnava Mică in Ghindari.

References

Rivers of Romania
Rivers of Harghita County
Rivers of Mureș County